Graham Knuttel is an Irish painter and sculptor, whose work has been collected by various celebrities, such as Sylvester Stallone, Robert De Niro, Frank Sinatra, Eddie Jordan and Michael Stipe. Initially known for sculptures, he has since become a painter.

He was born in 1954, several years after his parents had moved to Ireland from England. His father was born in Germany and Jewish who had emigrated to England with his mother after World War I and served with the RAF. His mother was a Unitarian from Northampton.

Education
He attended Sandford Park School, later graduating from the Dún Laoghaire school of Art and Design with a Diploma in Fine Art Sculpture.

Career

In 1976 he won the Royal Canada Trust Award for young Sculptors.

In 1981 he co-founded Wicklow Fine Art Press. He received commissions to paint Sylvester Stallone, Christy Moore, John B. Keane and Don King.

In 2008 An Post released two Knuttel-designed stamps to commemorate the Summer Olympics that year.

History and background

Graham Knuttel was born in Dublin in 1954. His German father, who served in the R.A.F., and English mother moved from England to Ireland in 1947. Knuttel has a very eccentric family history with a grandfather involved in World War 1 and vivid memories of his sadistic grandmother trying to lock him into his father's "huge dark wardrobe". He admits he can still hear her cackling and feel her nails clawing the back of his neck. The family on his father's side is clouded in secrecy and mystery but his mother's side is said to be more normal and relates closer to the art world. Knuttel is related to the founder of the Newlyn School of Painters, Thomas Cooper Gotch as well as the famous English actor Cary Grant who starred in Alfred Hitchcock's film To Catch a Thief. Knuttel has a brother (Peter, father of artist Jonathan Knuttel) and sister both approximately ten years older than he is. The age gap left him with a sense of independence that left him to follow his own destiny. Knuttel never cared much for academia and spent little time in school, rather spending his time exploring the cafe and pub society of Dublin as well as its rocky coastline. In his time away from school he began to absorb himself in drawing and art. He enrolled in the Dún Laoghaire College of Art and Design at the age of eighteen and the bohemian lifestyle of art school suited him well. It was during his time at Dún Laoghaire that his training led him to his beloved craft of figurative representational painting.  Although his style of painting did not receive the great acclaim it does now from a group of new American tutors. They appreciated a very different style of artwork and therefore Knuttel had to make the transition from painting to sculpture to pass his final year of college. Although this transition was undesired, Knuttel discovered a new passion for the craft. He received his diploma for an exhibition of mechanical wooden sculptures of a bird as well as medieval-themed pieces of a shield and a portcullis. (Knuttel, London '05)

References

External links
 Graham Knuttel official website

Artists from Dublin (city)
1954 births
20th-century Irish painters
21st-century Irish painters
Irish male painters
Irish sculptors
Living people
People educated at Sandford Park School
Irish people of German-Jewish descent
Irish Jews
20th-century sculptors
20th-century Irish male artists